Edward Carey (born April 1970, in North Walsham, Norfolk, England) is a playwright and novelist. He has written several adaptations for the stage, including Patrick Süskind's The Pigeon and Robert Coover's Pinocchio in Venice. His own plays include Sulking Thomas and Captain of the Birds. He collaborated with Eddin Khoo on the wayang kulit translation of Macbeth called Macbeth in the Shadows.

Biography
Carey attended the Nautical College, Pangbourne, as did his father and grandfather. He did not enlist in the Royal Navy, however. Instead, he participated in the National Youth Theatre and attended the University of Hull, earning a degree in drama in 1991.

As a young Man, Carey worked in Madame Tussauds wax museum (London), which would figure into his historical novel, Little.

Carey attended the University of Iowa International Writing Program and taught at the Iowa Writers' Workshop. 

He has lived in many European locations, but, in 2006, he took up permanent residence in the United States, settling in Austin where he teaches at the University of Texas. He is married to the writer Elizabeth McCracken.

Works

Edward Carey (2020). The Swallowed Man.

Awards
Fellow, Guggenheim Foundation (2019)

References

External links

Interview with Edward Carey, Harcourt Trade Publishers

1970 births
Iowa Writers' Workshop alumni
Living people
21st-century British novelists
British dramatists and playwrights
British male novelists
British male dramatists and playwrights
International Writing Program alumni
21st-century British male writers